Christophe Cavalleri (born 21 January 2002) is a Swiss professional ice hockey centre who is currently playing with  Genève-Servette HC of the National League (NL).

Playing career
Cavalleri played all of his junior hockey with Genève-Servette HC junior teams. He won the Elite Jr. A title with Servette U20 team during the 2018–19 season.

On February 3, 2021, Cavalleri signed his first professional contract, agreeing to a three-year deal with Genève-Servette through the 2023–24 season.

On September 1, 2021, Cavalleri was sent down to the Ticino Rockets of the Swiss League (SL) to begin the 2021–22 season. Cavalleri made his NL debut on September 7, 2021, in a 4-2 loss to the ZSC Lions at the Hallenstadion.

References

External links

2002 births
Living people
HC La Chaux-de-Fonds players
Genève-Servette HC players
Swiss ice hockey centres
HCB Ticino Rockets players
Ice hockey people from Geneva